Oedancala is a genus of true bugs in the family Pachygronthidae. There are about 14 described species in Oedancala.

Species
These 14 species belong to the genus Oedancala:

 Oedancala acuminata Slater, J.A., 1956 c g
 Oedancala bimaculata Distant, 1893 i c g
 Oedancala cladiumicola Baranowski, R.M. & J.A. Slater, 1989 c g
 Oedancala crassimana Fabricius, 1803 i c g b
 Oedancala cubana Stål, 1874 i c g
 Oedancala dorsalis Say, 1832 i c g b
 Oedancala husseyi Slater, J.A., 1955 c g
 Oedancala kormilevi Slater, J.A., 1955 c g
 Oedancala longirostris Slater, J.A., 1955 c g
 Oedancala meridionalis Stal, C., 1874 c g
 Oedancala mexicana Slater, J.A., 1955 c g
 Oedancala nana Slater, J.A., 1955 c g
 Oedancala notata Stal, C., 1874 c g
 Oedancala scutellata Baranowski, R.M. & J.A. Slater, 1982 c g

Data sources: i = ITIS, c = Catalogue of Life, g = GBIF, b = Bugguide.net

References

External links

 

Lygaeoidea
Articles created by Qbugbot